Drumnakilly (Irish: Droim na Coille, "Ridge of the Wood").) is a small village and townland between Carrickmore and Omagh in County Tyrone, Northern Ireland. In the 2001 Census it had a population of 114 people. The townland is situated in the historic barony of Strabane Upper and the civil parish of Termonmaguirk and covers an area of 1,352 acres. It lies within the Omagh District Council area.

History

The Troubles
On 30 August 1988 a Provisional Irish Republican Army detachment was ambushed by the British Army in the Drumnakilly neighbourhood whilst attempting to kill an off-duty Ulster Defence Regiment member, leading to the deaths of the IRA members.

Demography
The population of the townland declined during the 19th century:

See also
List of townlands of County Tyrone

References 

NI Neighbourhood Information System

Villages in County Tyrone
Townlands of County Tyrone
Civil parish of Termonmaguirk